Adventures of Captain America, also known in trade as The Adventures of Captain America: Sentinel of Liberty is a comic book limited series which was published by Marvel Comics. It was a four issue limited series written by Fabian Nicieza. The first two issues were drawn by Kevin Maguire while Kevin West was brought in to help out with the third and complete the story with the final issue.

Publication history
First Flight Of The Eagle (September 1991)
Betrayed By Agent X (November 1991)
Battleground: Paris Book (December 1991)
Angels Of Death Angels Of Hope (January 1992)

Plot
The storyline re-tells the early years of Steve Rogers' turn as the Star-Spangled Avenger.

See also
 1991 in comics

References

External links
 Adventures of Captain America at the Comic Book DB

1991 comics debuts
1992 comics endings
Marvel Comics titles
Comics by Fabian Nicieza
Captain America titles